"Porta Gia Ton Ourano" is a song recorded by Greek pop singer Helena Paparizou and the first single from Vrisko To Logo Na Zo. The song was released as a single on April 8, 2008 to radio stations all over Greece and Cyprus.

Song information 
The single officially debuted on April 8, 2008 when it was played for the first time on Kosmoradio of Thessaloniki. In Athens the song aired for the very first time on Sfera Radio.

The music is by Per Lidén, Niclas Olausson and Toni Mavridis, with lyrics by Eleana Vrahali. The photography used on the cover is by Elena's director Alexandros Grammatopoulos.

Music video
The music video was directed by Alexandros Grammatopoulos and was filmed on April 8, 2008. In it, Paparizou appeared with her new style for the first time. The shooting took place in Athens and lasted 48 hours. 

On April 14, 2008, MAD TV revealed the concept of the music video. Specifically MAD TV reported, " The new video of Elena Paparizou will be fairly ambient and rock having a central role in that play the elements of rain and the wind. It also contains several symbolic scenes such as feathers that appear suddenly in a telephone box, something similar to those elements that big stars use in their music videos, such as Madonna's music video "Frozen".

It made its television premiere on MAD TV's Mixer Greeks Only at 12:00 am on April 15, 2008. On 16 April the video was played all day, every hour on the hour. On April 19 the "Porta Gia Ton Ourano" music video debuted at number one on MAD TV Top 50 countdown.

Release history

Charts

References

External links

2008 singles
Helena Paparizou songs
Songs written by Eleana Vrahali
Songs written by Per Lidén
Number-one singles in Greece
2008 songs
Sony BMG singles